Hylomyscus is a genus of rodent in the family Muridae endemic to Africa.

It contains 21 species divided into six species groups:
H. aeta group
Beaded wood mouse, Hylomyscus aeta 
Mount Oku wood mouse, Hylomyscus grandis 
H. alleni group
Allen's wood mouse, Hylomyscus alleni 
Angolan wood mouse, Hylomyscus carillus 
Hylomyscus pamfi 
Flat-nosed wood mouse, Hylomyscus simus 
Stella wood mouse, Hylomyscus stella 
Walter Verheyen's mouse, Hylomyscus walterverheyeni 
H. anselli group
Ansell's wood mouse, Hylomyscus anselli 
Arc Mountain wood mouse, Hylomyscus arcimontensis 
Heinrich's wood mouse, Hylomyscus heinrichorum 
Kerbis Peterhans's wood mouse, Hylomyscus kerbispeterhansi  2014
Mahale wood mouse, Hylomyscus mpungamachagorum 
Pygmy wood mouse, Hylomyscus pygmaeus 
Stanley’s wood mouse, Hylomyscus stanleyi 
Mother Ellen’s wood mouse, Hylomyscus thornesmithae 
H. baeri group
Baer's wood mouse, Hylomyscus baeri 
H. denniae group
Montane wood mouse, Hylomyscus denniae 
Small-footed forest mouse, Hylomyscus endorobae 
Volcano wood mouse, Hylomyscus vulcanorum 
H. parvus group
Little wood mouse, Hylomyscus parvus

References

 
Rodent genera
Taxa named by Oldfield Thomas
Taxonomy articles created by Polbot